Change Research is a polling firm based in the San Francisco Bay Area. It was first incorporated as a public benefit corporation in July 2017 by Mike Greenfield, a former data scientist at PayPal and LinkedIn, and Pat Reilly, a former Democratic Party campaign operative. Unlike many other pollsters, Change Research conducts all of its polls online. It claims to offer accurate and inexpensive online polling. Its clients have included Democratic political candidates such as Lauren Underwood, who won a race in Illinois's 14th congressional district in 2018, as well as organizations such as the NAACP and AFL–CIO. In 2021, FiveThirtyEight ranked Change Research a "B−" for its historical accuracy and polling methodology and noted that it called 75% of races correctly.

References

External links

Organizations established in 2017
Polling companies
2017 establishments in California
Organizations based in San Francisco
Public benefit corporations based in California
Left-wing organizations in the United States